Information Sciences is a bimonthly peer-reviewed academic journal covering information science. It was established in 1968 and is published by Elsevier. The editor-in-chief is Witold Pedrycz (University of Alberta). According to the Journal Citation Reports, the journal has a 2021 impact factor of 8.233.

References

External links

Elsevier academic journals
Publications established in 1968
Bimonthly journals
Information science journals
English-language journals